Thomas William Wallace (born 1 March 1936) is a former Australian politician.

He was born in Sale to Harold Roy Wallace, a farmer, and Phyllis Violet. He attended Kilmany State School and Sale Technical School before becoming a grazier. He was active in the local community and in the National Party, and he was elected to Rosedale Shire Council in 1975, serving until 1982 (president 1980–81). In 1982 he was elected to the Victorian Legislative Assembly as the member for Gippsland South. While in parliament he was the party spokesman on housing, employment and training. In 1992 he left his seat to challenge Labor MLA Keith Hamilton in Morwell, but he was defeated. From 1994 to 1997 he was commissioner of the Shire of Baw Baw.

References

1936 births
Living people
National Party of Australia members of the Parliament of Victoria
Members of the Victorian Legislative Assembly
People from Sale, Victoria